Connoquenessing Township is a township in Butler County, Pennsylvania, United States. The population was 4,170 at the 2010 census.

History
Connoquenessing is known as the area in which George Washington was famously shot at by his French Indian guide. On 27 December 1753, just past Muthering Town, a Native American allied with the French (French Indian) joined Washington and Gist as a guide. The guide's behavior became wearisome to Washington and Gist. As the party was approaching a clearing the Indian stopped, turned on Washington and Gist and fired his musket. What could have been a fatal shot was taken no more than 15 steps away, missing both. They subdued the attacker and released him by 9 o’clock that evening. They then built a fire as if staying for first light, but Washington and Gist continued on throughout the night on the Venango trail (now part of Franklin Road and Route 528). Almost certain the French Indian would follow their tracks at day break, they thought it best to get a head start. A monument pillar stands at the Connoquenessing Municipal building dedicated to this incident.

The township was linked to Butler, Evans City and Pittsburgh in 1908 by the Pittsburgh, Harmony, Butler and New Castle Railway, an interurban trolley line. The line closed on 15 June 1931, and the trolleys were replaced by buses.

Geography
Connoquenessing Township is located in west-central Butler County, on the western edge of Butler Township and just west of the city of Butler, the county seat. The borough of Connoquenessing borders the township on the south, and the borough of Prospect borders it on the north.
 

Demographics

As of the census of 2000, there were 3,653 people, 1,386 households, and 1,056 families residing in the township.  The population density was 162.7 people per square mile (62.8/km2).  There were 1,458 housing units at an average density of 64.9/sq mi (25.1/km2).  The racial makeup of the township was 99.10% White, 0.11% African American, 0.14% Native American, 0.25% Asian, 0.03% Pacific Islander, 0.14% from other races, and 0.25% from two or more races. Hispanic or Latino of any race were 0.47% of the population.

There were 1,386 households, out of which 35.2% had children under the age of 18 living with them, 65.7% were married couples living together, 6.9% had a female householder with no husband present, and 23.8% were non-families. 20.6% of all households were made up of individuals, and 6.9% had someone living alone who was 65 years of age or older.  The average household size was 2.64 and the average family size was 3.06.

In the township the population was spread out, with 26.1% under the age of 18, 6.1% from 18 to 24, 31.5% from 25 to 44, 25.7% from 45 to 64, and 10.6% who were 65 years of age or older.  The median age was 37 years. For every 100 females there were 102.5 males.  For every 100 females age 18 and over, there were 102.6 males.

The median income for a household in the township was $41,060, and the median income for a family was $45,429. Males had a median income of $36,696 versus $27,460 for females. The per capita income for the township was $19,502.  About 5.7% of families and 7.6% of the population were below the poverty line, including 12.5% of those under age 18 and 8.4% of those age 65 or over.

References

External links
 Connoquenessing Township official website
 Early Connoquenessing Township history

Populated places established in 1795
Townships in Butler County, Pennsylvania